is a Japanese former professional racing cyclist, who rode professionally between 2004 and 2018.

After graduating from Hosei University, he joined the Shimano Racing team in 2004. After that, Doi mostly raced abroad, finishing second in the Tour of Siam (2007), eighth in the Tour de Langkawi (2007), fifth in the Tour de Hokkaido (2007), and sixth in the Tour of Turkey (2010). In 2011, he became the first Japanese to compete in the Vuelta a España, finishing in 150th place. In 2012, he won the Japanese National Road Race Championships.

Major results

2007
 2nd Overall Tour of Siam
 5th Overall Tour de Hokkaido
 8th Overall Tour de Langkawi
 9th Japan Cup
2008
 1st Stage 1b (TTT) Brixia Tour
 9th Japan Cup
2010
 6th Overall Presidential Cycling Tour of Turkey
 8th Overall Tour of Hainan
2012
 1st  Road race, National Road Championships
2013
 4th Overall Tour de East Java
 5th Overall Tour de Kumano
 8th Road race, National Road Championships
2014
 National Road Championships
5th Road race
9th Time trial
 10th Overall Tour of Iran
2015
 6th Overall Tour de Taiwan
 8th Time trial, National Road Championships
2016
 9th Road race, National Road Championships

References

External links

1983 births
Living people
Japanese male cyclists
People from Yamagata Prefecture
Hosei University alumni